The Silent Lie is a 1917 silent drama film, produced and released by Fox Film Corporation, directed by Raoul Walsh, and starring Walsh's then-wife Miriam Cooper.

The film was reissued as Camille of the Yukon in 1920, and is now considered a lost film.

Cast
 Miriam Cooper as Lady Lou
 Ralph Lewis as Hatfield
 Charles Clary as Conahan
 Monroe Salisbury as The Stranger
 Henry A. Barrows as The Priest
 Howard Davies as The Fur Dealer
 William Eagle Shirt as Indian

See also
List of lost films
1937 Fox vault fire

References

External links

The Silent Lie at SilentEra

lobby poster (1920 reissue as Camille of the Yukon)

1917 films
American silent feature films
Films directed by Raoul Walsh
Lost American films
1917 drama films
Silent American drama films
Fox Film films
American black-and-white films
1917 lost films
Lost drama films
1910s American films